Strzeszów  (German Stresow) is a village in the administrative district of Gmina Trzcińsko-Zdrój, within Gryfino County, West Pomeranian Voivodeship, in north-western Poland.

The village has a population of 220.

References

Villages in Gryfino County